Lev Kokorin (19 August 1918 – 1 February 1989) was a Soviet water polo player. He competed in the men's tournament at the 1952 Summer Olympics.

References

External links
 

1918 births
1989 deaths
Soviet male water polo players
Olympic water polo players of the Soviet Union
Water polo players at the 1952 Summer Olympics
Place of birth missing